Ballard is a city in Uintah County, Utah, United States. The population was 801 at the 2010 census, an increase from the 2000 population of 566.

Geography
According to the United States Census Bureau, the town has a total area of 14.0 square miles (36.3 km), all land.

Demographics

At the 2000 census there were 566 people, 181 households, and 146 families in the town. The population density was 40.4 people per square mile (15.6/km). There were 196 housing units at an average density of 14.0 per square mile (5.4/km).  The racial makeup of the town was 95.41% White, 0.18% African American, 3.00% Native American, 0.53% from other races, and 0.88% from two or more races. Hispanic or Latino of any race were 1.41%.
Of the 181 households, 47.0% had children under 18, 70.7% were married couples, 3.9% had a female householder with no husband present, and 19.3% were non-families. 18.2% of households were one person, and 7.7% were one person aged 65 or older. The average household size was 3.13, and the average family size was 3.58.

The age distribution was 34.6% under the age of 18, 10.2% from 18 to 24, 26.5% from 25 to 44, 20.3% from 45 to 64, and 8.3% 65 or older. The median age was 30 years. For every 100 females, there were 108.9 males.

The median household income was $35,278, and the median family income was $36,484. Males had a median income of $29,875 versus $17,361 for females. The per capita income for the town was $12,620. About 7.7% of families and 8.5% of the population were below the poverty line, including 6.8% of those under age 18 and 17.0% of those aged 65 or over.

References

External links

 

Cities in Utah
Cities in Uintah County, Utah
Populated places established in 1905
1905 establishments in Utah